Auletris is a collection of erotic short stories by Anaïs Nin, published posthumously by Sky Blue Press in 2016. It features the short pieces  "Life in Provincetown" and "Marcel," the latter of which appeared in a severely edited form in Delta of Venus (1977).

References

 2016 short story collections
Books published posthumously
Erotic short stories
Short story collections by Anaïs Nin
American short story collections